Pogonodon is an extinct genus of cat-like nimravid endemic to North America during the Oligocene.

References 

Nimravidae
Oligocene feliforms
Prehistoric mammals of North America
Prehistoric carnivoran genera
Taxa named by Edward Drinker Cope
Fossil taxa described in 1880